Pseudostypella is a fungal genus in the family Auriculariaceae. The genus is monotypic, containing the single species Pseudostypella nothofagi, found in New Zealand.

References

External links
 

Auriculariales
Fungi of New Zealand
Monotypic Basidiomycota genera